The Handel festival or "Commemoration" took place in Westminster Abbey between 26 May and 5 June 1784, to commemorate the twenty-fifth anniversary of the death of George Frideric Handel in 1759.

The commemoration was organized by John Montagu, 4th Earl of Sandwich and the Concerts of Antient Music and took the form of a series of concerts of Handel's music, given in the Abbey by vast numbers of singers and instrumentalists.

Above Handel's own monument in the Abbey, there is a small additional tablet to record the commemoration. An account of the commemoration was published by Charles Burney in the following year (1785).

The commemoration established a fashion for large-scale performances of Handel's choral works throughout the nineteenth century and much of the twentieth. E.D. Mackerness (in A Social History of English Music) described it as "the most important single event in the history of English music".

References
E.D. Mackerness, A Social History of English Music, London, 1964.
H. Diack Johnstone, A Ringside Seat at the Handel Commemoration. Musical Times, Vol. 125, No. 1701 (Nov., 1984), pp. 632–633+635-636
William Weber, The 1784 Handel Commemoration as Political Ritual. Journal of British Studies, Vol. 28, No. 1 (Jan., 1989), pp. 43–69
Pierre Dubois, Reviews of the Handel Commemoration of 1784: Discourse and Reception. ESSE-8: LONDON 2006

External links
 Charles Burney, An Account of the Musical Performances in Westminster-Abbey (London: Payne, 1785)
Handel's monument at Westminster Abbey 
Messiah in other hands by Donald Burrows
The Original Academy of Ancient Music by William Weber

George Frideric Handel
Baroque music
Handel festivals
1784 festivals
Classical music festivals in England